Huntingtin-interacting protein 1-related protein is a protein that in humans is encoded by the HIP1R gene.

References

Further reading